St. Catharines Heidelberg was a Canadian soccer club based in St. Catharines, Ontario. The club was founded in 1960 and originally competed in the International Soccer League (later renamed Inter-City Soccer League). In 1971, the club joined the professional ranks in the National Soccer League (NSL) and played in the league for eight seasons from 1971 until the 1978 season. In 1979, Heidelberg departed from the NSL which left St. Catharines Roma as the sole representative for the city of St. Catharines in the National Soccer League.

History   
St. Catharines Heidelberg was formed in 1960 and represented the German Canadian community in the Niagara region, with club president Connie Kolbow playing an instrumental role in the establishment of the organization. St. Catharines initially played in the International Soccer League (later renamed Inter-City Soccer League) in 1960 and secured the Hiram Walker Cup in 1961 which was the playoff championship title. In 1964, Heidelberg clinched the regular-season title (McGuiness Trophy) but lost the Hiram Walker Cup to Hamilton Hungarians. The club secured their first double (McGuiness & Hiram Walker Cups) in the 1968 season. Their final notable season in the Inter-City Soccer League was in 1969 when they claimed their third playoff title. 

In 1971, Heidelberg became the first club from the Niagara region to receive a franchise in the National Soccer League, and in their debut season were named the league's Most Gentlemanly Team. In their initial years in the NSL, the club qualified for the postseason twice in 1971, and the 1973 season. In 1975, the NSL ownership decided to partition the league into two separate divisions with a promotion and relegation system with St. Catharines being placed in the Second Division. Though Heidelberg failed in securing a promotion in the First Division the club still managed to secure the division's playoff championship by defeating Windsor Stars. 

St. Catharines' final notable performance occurred in the 1978 season when Heidelberg finished as runners-up in the Second Division, and qualified for the promotion/relegation playoff match. Unfortunately in the following season, the Second Division was dissolved due to several clubs departing from the NSL because of failure to successfully pay all membership dues on the required deadline. St. Catharines violated the bylaw and as a result, was suspended for the season, but ultimately failed to return to the professional level.

Honours 

 National Soccer League Second Division Playoff Championship: 1975
 Inter-City Soccer League Hiram Walker Cup: 1961, 1968, 1969
 Inter-City Soccer League McGuiness Cup: 1964, 1965, 1968

Seasons

References  
  

1960 establishments in Ontario
1979 disestablishments in Ontario
Association football clubs established in 1960
Association football clubs disestablished in 1979
Defunct soccer clubs in Canada
Canadian National Soccer League teams
Diaspora sports clubs in Canada
Sport in St. Catharines